Dieter Lemke (14 April 1956 –15 February 2015) was a German football forward.

References

External links
 

1956 births
2015 deaths
German footballers
Bundesliga players
2. Bundesliga players
VfL Bochum players
SC Fortuna Köln players
Place of birth missing
Association football forwards